L'Anse-au-Diable was a small settlement located south west of Red Bay, Newfoundland and Labrador.

See also
 List of ghost towns in Newfoundland and Labrador

Populated places in Labrador